Le Claire Township is a township in Scott County, Iowa, USA.  As of the 2000 census, its population was 4,263.

Geography
According to the USGS, it contains four cemeteries: Fairview, Glendale, Jacks and LeClaire Prairie.

The streams of McCarty Creek, Olathea Creek, Silver Creek and Sycamore Creek run through this township.

Transportation
Le Claire Township contains two airports or landing strips: Schurr Airport and Schurr Landing Strip.

References
 USGS Geographic Names Information System (GNIS)

External links
 US-Counties.com
 City-Data.com

Townships in Scott County, Iowa
Townships in Iowa